The Christian countercult movement or the Christian anti-cult movement is a social movement among certain Protestant evangelical and fundamentalist and other Christian ministries ("discernment ministries") and individual activists who oppose religious sects that they consider cults.

Overview
Christian countercult activism mainly stems from evangelicalism or fundamentalism. The countercult movement asserts that particular Christian sects are erroneous because their beliefs are not in accordance with the teachings of the Bible. It also states that a religious sect can be considered a cult if its beliefs involve a denial of any of the essential Christian teachings (such as salvation, the Trinity, Jesus himself as a person, the ministry and miracles of Jesus, his crucifixion, his resurrection, the Second Coming and the Rapture).

Countercult ministries often concern themselves with religious sects that consider themselves Christian but hold beliefs that are thought to contradict the teachings of the Bible. Such sects may include: The Church of Jesus Christ of Latter-day Saints, the Unification Church, Christian Science, and the Jehovah's Witnesses. Some Protestants classify the Catholic Church as a cult. Some also denounce non-Christian religions such as Islam, Wicca, Paganism, New Age groups, Buddhism, Hinduism and other religions like UFO religions.

Countercult literature usually expresses specific doctrinal or theological concerns and it also has a missionary or apologetic purpose. It presents a rebuttal by emphasizing the teachings of the Bible against the beliefs of non-fundamental Christian sects. Christian countercult activist writers also emphasize the need for Christians to evangelize to followers of cults. Some Christians also share concerns similar to those of the secular anti-cult movement.

The movement publishes its views through a variety of media, including books, magazines, and newsletters, radio broadcasting, audio and video cassette production, direct-mail appeals, proactive evangelistic encounters, professional and avocational websites, as well as lecture series, training workshops and counter-cult conferences.

History

Precursors and pioneers
Christians have applied theological criteria to assess the teachings of non-orthodox movements throughout church history. The Apostles themselves were involved in challenging the doctrines and claims of various teachers. The Apostle Paul wrote an entire epistle, Galatians, antagonistic to the teachings of a Jewish sect that claimed adherence to the teachings of both Jesus and Moses (cf. Acts 15 and Gal. 1:6–10). The First Epistle of John is devoted to countering early proto-Gnostic cults that had arisen in the first century CE, all claiming to be Christian (1 John 2:19).

The early Church in the post-apostolic period was much more involved in "defending its frontiers against alternative soteriologies—either by defining its own position with greater and greater exactness, or by attacking other religions, and particularly the Hellenistic mysteries." In fact, a good deal of the early Christian literature is devoted to the exposure and refutation of unorthodox theology, mystery religions and Gnostic groups. Irenaeus, Tertullian and Hippolytus of Rome were some of the early Christian apologists who engaged in critical analyses of unorthodox theology, Greco-Roman pagan religions, and Gnostic groups.

In the Protestant tradition, some of the earliest writings opposing unorthodox groups (such as the Swedenborgians) can be traced back to John Wesley, Alexander Campbell and Princeton Theological Seminary theologians like Charles Hodge and B. B. Warfield. The first known usage of the term cult by a Protestant apologist to denote a group is heretical or unorthodox is in Anti-Christian Cults by A. H. Barrington, published in 1898.

Quite a few of the pioneering apologists were Baptist pastors, like I. M. Haldeman, or participants in the Plymouth Brethren, like William C. Irvine and Sydney Watson. Watson wrote a series of didactic novels like Escaped from the Snare: Christian Science, Bewitched by Spiritualism, and The Gilded Lie (Millennial Dawnism), as warnings of the dangers posed by cultic groups. Watson's use of fiction to counter the cults has been repeated by later novelists like Frank E. Peretti.

The early twentieth-century apologists generally applied the words heresy and sects to groups like the Christadelphians, Mormons, Jehovah's Witnesses, Spiritualists, and Theosophists. This was reflected in several chapters contributed to the multi-volume work released in 1915 The Fundamentals, where apologists criticized the teachings of Charles Taze Russell, Mary Baker Eddy, the Mormons and Spiritualists.

Mid-twentieth-century apologists
Since the 1940s, the approach of traditional Christians was to apply the meaning of cult such that it included those religious groups who use other scriptures beside the Bible or have teachings and practices deviating from traditional Christian teachings and practices. Some examples of sources (with published dates where known) that documented this approach are:
 The Missionary Faces Isms, by John C. Mattes, pub. 1937 (Board of American Missions of the United Lutheran Church in America). 
 Heresies Ancient and Modern, by J. Oswald Sanders, pub. 1948 (Marshall Morgan & Scott, London/Zondervan, Grand Rapids). 
 
 
 Heresies Exposed, by W. C. Irvine, pub. 1917, 1921, 1985 (Loizeaux Brothers). 
 Confusion of Tongues, by C. W. Ferguson, pub. 1928 (Doran & Co). 
 Isms New and Old, by Julius Bodensieck. 
 Some Latter-Day Religions, by G. H. Combs. 

One of the first prominent countercult apologists was Jan Karel van Baalen (1890–1968), an ordained minister in the Christian Reformed Church in North America. His book The Chaos of Cults, which was first published in 1938, became a classic in the field as it was repeatedly revised and updated until 1962.

Walter Ralston Martin
Historically, one of the most important protagonists of the movement was Walter Martin (1928–1989), whose numerous books include the 1955 The Rise of the Cults: An Introductory Guide to the Non-Christian Cults and the 1965 The Kingdom of the Cults: An Analysis of Major Cult Systems in the Present Christian Era, which continues to be influential. He became well-known in conservative Christian circles through a radio program, "The Bible Answer Man", currently hosted by Hank Hanegraaff.

In The Rise of the Cults, Martin gave the following definition of a cult:

By cultism we mean the adherence to doctrines which are pointedly contradictory to orthodox Christianity and which yet claim the distinction of either tracing their origin to orthodox sources or of being in essential harmony with those sources. Cultism, in short, is any major deviation from orthodox Christianity relative to the cardinal doctrines of the Christian faith.

As Martin's definition suggests, the countercult ministries concentrate on non-traditional groups that claim to be Christian, so chief targets have been, Jehovah's Witnesses, Armstrongism, Christian Science and the Unification Church, but also smaller groups like the Swedenborgian Church.

Various other conservative Christian leaders—among them John Ankerberg and Norman Geisler—have emphasized themes similar to Martin's. Perhaps more importantly, numerous other well-known conservative Christian leaders as well as many conservative pastors have accepted Martin's definition of a cult as well as his understanding of the groups to which he gave that label. Dave Breese summed up this kind of definition in these words:
A cult is a religious perversion. It is a belief and practice in the world of religion which calls for devotion to a religious view or leader centered in false doctrine. It is an organized heresy. A cult may take many forms but it is basically a religious movement which distorts or warps orthodox faith to the point where truth becomes perverted into a lie. A cult is impossible to define except against the absolute standard of the teaching of Holy Scripture.

Discernment blogging
Kenne "Ken" Silva is said by other discernment bloggers to have pioneered online discernment ministry. Ken was a Baptist pastor who ran the discernment blog "Apprising". Silva wrote many blog articles about the Emerging Church, the Word of Faith Movement, the Jehovah's Witnesses, the Gay Christian Movement, and many other groups. He started his blog in 2005 and wrote there until his death in 2014.

Silva's work paved the way for other internet discernment ministries such as Pirate Christian Radio, a group of blogs and podcasts founded by Lutheran pastor Chris Rosebrough in 2008, and Pulpit & Pen, a discernment blog founded by Baptist pastor and polemicist J.D. Hall.

Other technical terminology
Since the 1980s, the term new religions or new religious movements has slowly entered into evangelical usage alongside the word cult. Some book titles use both terms.

The acceptance of these alternatives to the word cult in evangelicalism reflects, in part, the wider usage of such language in the sociology of religion.

Apologetics
The term countercult apologetics first appeared in Protestant evangelical literature as a self-designation in the late 1970s and early 1980s in articles by Ronald Enroth and David Fetcho, and by Walter Martin in Martin Speaks Out on the Cults. A mid-1980s debate about apologetic methodology between Ronald Enroth and J. Gordon Melton, led the latter to place more emphasis in his publications on differentiating the Christian countercult from the secular anti-cult. Eric Pement urged Melton to adopt the label "Christian countercult", and since the early 1990s the terms has entered into popular usage and is recognized by sociologists such as Douglas Cowan.

The only existing umbrella organization within the countercult movement in the United States is the EMNR (Evangelical Ministries to New Religions), founded in 1982 by Martin, Enroth, Gordon Lewis, and James Bjornstad.

Worldwide organizations
While the greatest number of countercult ministries are found in the United States, ministries exist in Australia, Brazil, Canada, Denmark, England, Ethiopia, Germany, Hungary, Italy, Mexico, New Zealand, Philippines, Romania, Russia, Sweden, and Ukraine. A comparison between the methods employed in the United States and other nations discloses some similarities in emphasis, but also other nuances in emphasis. The similarities are that globally these ministries share a common concern about the evangelization of people in cults and new religions. There is also often a common thread of comparing orthodox doctrines and biblical passages with the teachings of the groups under examination. In some of the European and southern hemisphere contexts, however, confrontational methods of engagement are not always relied on, and dialogical approaches are sometimes advocated.

A group of organizations that originated within the context of established religion is working in more general fields of "cult awareness," especially in Europe. Their leaders are theologians, and they are often social ministries affiliated to big churches.

Protestant
 Berlin-based  (Parish Office for Sects and World Views) headed by Lutheran pastor Thomas Gandow
Swiss  (Protestant Reformed Zwinglian Information Service on Churches, Sects and Religions) headed by Zwinglian parson Georg Schmid

Catholic
 (Sects and ideologies in Saxony)
  (Worldviews and religious groups) of the Roman Catholic Diocese of Linz, Austria
 GRIS, Italy

Orthodox
Synodic Committee about Heresies of Greek Orthodox Church
Center for Religious Studies in the name of Hieromartyr Ireneus of Lyon in Russia.

Contextual missiology
The phenomena of cults has also entered into the discourses of Christian missions and theology of religions. An initial step in this direction occurred in 1980 when the Lausanne Committee for World Evangelization convened a mini-consultation in Thailand. From that consultation a position paper was produced. The issue was revisited at the Lausanne Forum in 2004 with another paper. The latter paper adopts a different methodology to that advocated in 1980.

In the 1990s, discussions in academic missions and theological journals indicate that another trajectory is emerging that reflects the influence of contextual missions theory. Advocates of this approach maintain that apologetics as a tool needs to be retained, but do not favor a confrontational style of engagement.

Variations and models
Countercult apologetics has several variations and methods employed in analyzing and responding to cults. The different nuances in countercult apologetics have been discussed by John A. Saliba and Philip Johnson.

The dominant method is the emphasis on detecting unorthodox or heretical doctrines and contrasting those with orthodox interpretations of the Bible and early creedal documents. Some apologists, such as Francis J. Beckwith, have emphasized a philosophical approach, pointing out logical, epistemological and metaphysical problems within the teachings of a particular group. Another approach involves former members of cultic groups recounting their spiritual autobiographies, which highlight experiences of disenchantment with the group, unanswered questions and doubts about commitment to the group, culminating in the person's conversion to evangelical Christianity.

Apologists like Dave Hunt in Peace, Prosperity and the Coming Holocaust and Hal Lindsey in The Terminal Generation have tended to interpret the phenomena of cults as part of the burgeoning evidence of signs that Christ's Second Advent is close at hand. Both Hunt and Constance Cumbey have applied a conspiracy model to interpreting the emergence of New Age spirituality and linking that to speculations about fulfilled prophecies heralding Christ's reappearance.

Prominent advocates

People

Constance Cumbey
Ronald Enroth, sociologist and Christian author of books about cults and new religious movements.
Norman Geisler
Douglas Groothuis
Dave Hunt
Greg Koukl
Bob Larson
Walter Martin, late Baptist minister who was the host of the Bible Answer Man radio broadcast and the president of the Christian Research Institute.  He often used his show to promote arguments against Jehovah's Witnesses, The Church of Jesus Christ of Latter-day Saints, and other movements. (The show is now hosted by Hank Hanegraaff.)
Josh McDowell, Christian author
J. P. Moreland, Biola University
Bob and Gretchen Passantino

Organizations
Answers in Action, Bob and Gretchen Passantino
Apologetics Index
Apologetics resource center, by Craig Branch
Apologetics Press, current Executive Director Dr. Dave Miller
Apprising, Blog of Ken Silva
Banner Ministries UK, Tricia Tillin
Christian Apologetics and Research Ministry (CARM) founded by Matthew Slick
Christian Research Institute (CRI) founded by Walter Martin
Cult Awareness and Information Centre founded by the late Jan Groenveld
Dialog Center International founded by Johannes Aagaard
EMNR Evangelical Ministries to New Religions, an umbrella group for ministries to the cults and new religions
Midwest Christian Outreach
Mormonism Research Ministry (Bill McKeever)
Personal Freedom Outreach
Pirate Christian Radio, founded by Lutheran Pastor Chris Rosebrough
Pulpit & Pen, Discernment blog founded by Baptist Pastor and Polemicist J.D. Hall
Reachout Trust, leader Michael Thomas
Spiritual Counterfeits Project, president Tal Brooke
Stand To Reason, founded by Greg Koukl and Melinda Penner
Utah Lighthouse Ministry (Jerald & Sandra Tanner)
Watchman Fellowship, founder David Henke, president James K. Walker

See also

 Anti-cult movement

References

Primary sources

Abanes, Richard, Cults, New Religious Movements, and Your Family, Crossway Books, Wheaton, 1998.
Ankerberg, John and John Weldon, Encyclopedia of Cults and New Religions, Harvest House, Eugene, 1999.
Enroth, Ronald (ed)., A Guide to New Religious Movements, InterVarsity Press, Downers Grove, 2005.
Geisler, Norman L. and Ron Rhodes, When Cultists Ask, Baker, Grand Rapids, 1997
House, H.Wayne, Charts of Cults, Sects and Religious Movements, Zondervan, Grand Rapids, 2000.
LeBar, James J. Cults, Sects, and the New Age, Our Sunday Visitor, Huntington, 1989.
Martin, Walter R. The Kingdom of the Cults, edited by Ravi Zacharias, Bethany, Bloomington, 2003
McDowell, Josh and Don Stewart, Handbook of Today's Religions, Thomas Nelson, Nashville, 1992
Rhodes, Ron, The Challenge of the Cults and New Religions, Zondervan, Grand Rapids, 2001
Sire, James W. Scripture Twisting: Twenty Ways the Cults Misread the Bible, InterVarsity Press, Downers Grove, 1980.
Sire, James W. The Universe Next Door 4th ed., InterVarsity Press, Downers Grove, 2004.
Tucker, Ruth A. Another Gospel: Cults, Alternative Religions and the New Age Movement, Zondervan, Grand Rapids, 2004.
Vatican Report on Sects, Cults and New Religious Movements, St. Paul Publications, Sydney, 1988.

History and critical assessments

Cowan, Douglas E. Bearing False Witness? An Introduction to the Christian Countercult (Praeger Publishers, Westport, Connecticut & London, 2003).
Enroth, Ronald M. and J. Gordon Melton, Why Cults Succeed Where The Church Fails (Brethren Press, Elgin, 1985).
Jenkins, Philip, Mystics and Messiahs: Cults and New Religions in American History (Oxford University Press, New York, 2000).
Johnson, Philip, "Apologetics, Mission, and New Religious Movements: A Holistic Approach," Sacred Tribes: Journal of Christian Missions to New Religious Movements, 1 (1) (2002)
Melton, J. Gordon., "The counter-cult monitoring movement in historical perspective," in Challenging Religion: Essays in Honour of Eileen Barker, edited by James A. Beckford & James T. Richardson, (Routledge, London, 2003), pp. 102–113.
Saliba, John A., Understanding New Religious Movements, 2nd edition (Alta Mira Press, Walnut Creek, Lanham, New York & Oxford, 2003).

External links
Apologetics Index; The counter-cult movement
Douglas E. Cowan: Christian Countercult Website Profiles
CESNUR: Overview of Christian Countercult movement by Douglas E. Cowan
Counter Cult Movement at Religious Tolerance
Jeff Lindsay's discussion of cults from an LDS perspective
Article: Anti-"Minority Religion" Groups with "Big Religion" Ties

 
Anti-cult movement